Jake Sanderson (born July 8, 2002) is an American professional ice hockey defenseman for the Ottawa Senators of the National Hockey League (NHL). He was drafted fifth overall by the Senators in the 2020 NHL Entry Draft.

Early life
Sanderson was born on July 8, 2002, in Whitefish, Montana, U.S. to former NHL forward Geoff Sanderson and his wife Ellen. His uncle Guy played for Clarkson College while his father's cousins Wade and Sheldon Brookbank both played in the NHL. Similarly, his brother Ben committed to playing ice hockey at Colorado College and his younger brother Sawyer plays AA hockey. While his father played professionally, Sanderson and his brothers moved to Phoenix, Arizona, Buffalo, New York, and Columbus, Ohio.

In Whitefish, Sanderson competed for the Glacier Avalanche of the Glacier Hockey Association alongside his brother Ben from age eight to 11. At the age of 12, the family moved to Calgary, Alberta where he gained dual-citizenship with Canada and the United States. Sanderson originally aspired to be a goaltender and even had his own set of equipment at one point, but was eventually deterred by his father and committed to being a skater. He played a mix of forward and defense growing up and eventually became a full-time defenseman at 14 years of age.

Playing career 
Upon moving to Calgary, Sanderson played within the Springbank Rockies minor hockey association and earned stints with the Calgary Bantam AAA Flames and the Edge School Mountaineers Elite 15s. He was eventually drafted in the fourth round of the Western Hockey League (WHL) draft by the Kootenay Ice but chose to maintain his NCAA eligibility. Sanderson eventually moved to play at the Edge School before joining the U.S. National Development Team (USNDPT).

As a member of the USNTDP, Sanderson was encouraged to graduate early from high school and play college hockey a year early. He was scouted by two schools, the University of North Dakota (UND) and Harvard University, before agreeing to UND. In his final year with the USNDPT, Sanderson recorded 29 points in 47 games. As a result, he ranked 4th amongst North American skaters by the NHL Central Scouting Bureau's final ranking. Before the 2020 NHL Entry Draft, Sanderson was named the winner of the Dave Tyler Junior Player of the Year Award for most outstanding United States-born player in junior hockey.

Collegiate
Sanderson joined the North Dakota Fighting Hawks men's ice hockey team for the 2020–21 season while majoring in kinesiology. As a freshman, he recorded two goals and 13 assists for 15 points through 22 games. Sanderson recorded his first collegiate goal on December 4, 2020, before missing seven games to compete at the 2021 World Junior Ice Hockey Championships with Team USA. He finished his rookie season with numerous honors including being named to the All-NCHC Rookie Team, NCHC Distinguished Scholar-Athlete, and earning All-NCHC Academic Team honors. During the quarterfinals of the NCAA championship, Sanderson led the team in both shots on goal and blocks while seeing nearly 53 minutes of ice time during a historic 5OT game.

Sanderson returned to UND for his sophomore season as an assistant captain, where he was named to the 2021 NCHC Preseason All-Conference Team.

Professional
Having completed his sophomore season, Sanderson, while recovering from a hand injury, opted to conclude his collegiate career by agreeing to sign a three-year, entry-level contract with the Ottawa Senators on March 27, 2022. He would go on to make his NHL debut in October against the Buffalo Sabres. Sanderson scored his first NHL goal on November 23, 2022 in a 4–1 loss against the Vegas Golden Knights.

International play

While Sanderson is a dual citizen of the United States and Canada, he has chosen to represent the United States internationally. As a member of Team USA at the 2021 World Junior Ice Hockey Championships, he assisted the game-winning goal in the semifinals against Finland. During the finals, he led all team members in ice time with 21 minutes, 41 seconds as they captured the gold medal against Canada.

With his last year of U20 eligibility, Jake Sanderson returned to represent the United States at the 2022 World Junior Ice Hockey Championships. On December 21, 2021, it was announced he would be the Captain of the team.

On January 10, 2022, Sanderson accepted an invitation to play for the US Men's Olympic hockey team at just 19 years old. NHL players were ineligible to compete due to COVID-19 complications. On February 4, 2022, Sanderson was put into isolation in California before the Olympic Games due to a positive Covid test.

Career statistics

Regular season and playoffs

International

Awards and honors

References

External links
 

2002 births
Living people
AHCA Division I men's ice hockey All-Americans
American men's ice hockey defensemen
American people of Canadian descent
Ice hockey people from Montana
Ice hockey players at the 2022 Winter Olympics
National Hockey League first-round draft picks
Olympic ice hockey players of the United States
Ottawa Senators draft picks
Ottawa Senators players
People from Whitefish, Montana